Baker is a common surname of Old English (Anglo-Saxon) origin and Scotland where Gaelic was anglicized. From England the surname has spread to neighbouring countries such as Wales, Scotland and Ireland, and also to the English speaking areas of the Americas and Oceania where it is also common. The gaelic form of Baker in Scotland and Ireland is Mac a' Bhacstair. Some people with the surname have used DNA to trace their origins to Celtic countries and specifically to the Baxter sept of the Clan MacMillan in Scotland. It is an occupational name, which originated before the 8th century CE, from the name of the trade, baker. From the Middle English bakere and Old English bæcere, a derivation of bacan, meaning "to dry by heat". The bearer of this name may not only have been a baker of bread. The name was also used for others involved with baking in some way, including the owner of a communal oven in humbler communities. The female form of the name is Baxter, which is seen more in Scotland. The German form of the name is Bäcker.

The name, Baker, appeared in many references, and from time to time, the surname was spelt Baker, Bakere and these changes in spelling frequently occurred within the family name. Scribes and church officials spelt the name as it sounded, and frequently the spelling changed even during the person's own lifetime. The family name Baker entered Britain with the Anglo-Saxons, who traditionally are said to have settled Britain from the 5th century CE, although Germanic communities were already well established in Britain long before this time.

Notable people with the surname include:

A
 A. J. Baker (1923–2017), Australian philosopher
 Aaron Baker (1620–1683), English colonial agent
 Ada Baker (1866 – 1949), Australian soprano, vaudeville star and singing teacher
 Adam J. Baker (1821–?), Canadian politician
 Adam Baker (footballer) (born 1993), English footballer
 Al Baker (magician) (1874–1951), American magician
 Al Baker (baseball) (1906–1982), American baseball player
 Alan Baker (disambiguation)
 Albert Baker (disambiguation)
 Alexander Baker (Jesuit) (1582–1638), English Jesuit
 Alexander Baker (MP) (1611–1685), English lawyer and politician
 Alf Baker (1898–1955), English footballer (Arsenal)
 Alfred Joseph Baker (1846–1900), played for England in England v Scotland representative matches (1870–1872)
 Alfred Baker (academic) (1848–1942), Canadian academic
 Alice Baker (veteran) (1898–2006), British World War I service veteran
 Alice Baker (set decorator), American set decorator
 Alison Baker (writer) (born 1953), American short story writer
 Alison Baker (racewalker) (born 1964), Canadian racewalker
 Allan Baker, Australian rapist and murderer
 Amanda Baker (born 1979), American actress
 Andrea Baker, American actress
 Anita Baker (born 1958), Grammy Award-winning American rhythm & blues singer-songwriter
 Ann Baker (1930–2017), American actress
 Anna P. Baker (1928–1985), Canadian visual artist
 Anne Elizabeth Baker (1786–1861), philologist and illustrator of Northampton, England
 Annie Baker (born 1981), American playwright
 Arnie Baker (born 1953), Canadian cyclist, coach and writer
 Art
 Arthur Baker (disambiguation)
 Ashley Baker (born 1990), English goalkeeper
 Augustine Baker (1575–1641), Welsh Benedictine monk and ascetical writer

B
Bart Baker American entertainer, singer, and comedian
 Ben or Benjamin Baker (disambiguation)
 Bernard Baker (disambiguation)
 Berniece Baker Miracle (1919–2014), née Baker, American writer and half-sister of actress Marilyn Monroe
 Betsy Baker (supercentenarian) (1842–1955), British–born American supercentenarian
 Betsy Baker (born 1955), American actress
 Billy or Bill Baker (disambiguation)
 Blake Baker (born 1982), American football coach
 Blanche Baker (painter) (1844–1929), British artist
 Bobby or Bob and Bobby Baker (disambiguation)
 Brad Baker (baseball) (born 1980), American baseball pitcher
 Brad Baker (motorcyclist) (born 1993), American motorcycle racer
 Brian Baker (disambiguation)
 Britt Baker (born 1991), American professional wrestler
 Bruce Baker (disambiguation), multiple people
 Bryan Baker (racing driver) (born 1961), American NASCAR driver
 Bryan Baker (fighter) (born 1985), American mixed martial artist
 Bryan Baker (baseball) (born 1994), American baseball player
 Buck Baker (1919–2002), American NASCAR driver
 Budda Baker (born 1996), American football player
 Buddy Baker (1941–2015), American NASCAR driver, son of Buck Baker
 Buddy Baker (composer) (1918–2002), American composer who scored many Disney films

C
 Caleb Baker (1762–1849), American politician
 Carl Baker (boxer) (born 1982), English boxer
 Carl Baker (born 1982), English footballer
 Carroll Baker (born 1931), American actress
 Carroll Baker (singer) (born 1949), Canadian country singer and songwriter
 Charlie or Charles Baker (disambiguation)
 Cheryl Baker (born 1954), British singer and television presenter
 Chet Baker (1929–1988), American jazz musician
 Chilton C. Baker (1874-1967), American politician
 Chris or Christopher Baker (disambiguation)
 Chuck Baker (born 1952), Major League Baseball infielder
 Cis Baker (fl.1920s), English footballer
 Claire Baker (born 1971), Scottish Labour Party politician
 Clarence Baker (1928–1989), Canadian politician
 Clement Baker (by 1470–1516), English politician
 Clive Baker (footballer, born 1934) (1934–2012), English footballer
 Clive Baker (footballer, born 1959), English footballer
 Colin Baker (disambiguation)
 Colson Baker (born 1990) aka Machine Gun Kelly, American rapper and actor
 Conrad Baker (1817–1885), 15th governor of Indiana
 Conway Baker (1911–1997), American football player
 Corey Baker (baseball) (born 1989), American baseball player
 Corey Baker (choreographer), New Zealand choreographer
 Cyril Baker (1885–1949), English cricketer

D
 D'Arcy Baker (1877–1932), British businessman and racing driver
 Dale Baker (1939–2012), Australian politician
 Dallas Baker (born 1982), American footballer
 Dan, Danny or Daniel Baker (disambiguation)
 Darius Baker (1845–1926), Justice of the Rhode Island Supreme Court 
 Dave or David Baker (disambiguation)
 Dean Baker (born 1958), American macroeconomist
 Deandre Baker (born 1997), American football player
 Deborah Baker, American biographer and essayist
 Del Baker (1892–1973), American baseball player and manager
 Dennis Baker (disambiguation)
 Dessie Baker (born 1977), Irish soccer player
 Diane Baker (born 1938), American actress
 Dick Baker (1938–2001), Canadian racing driver
 Doc Baker (died c.early 1920s), American footballer
 Don Baker (musician) (born 1950), Irish musician and actor
 Donald Baker (bishop) (1882–1968), Anglican bishop of Bendigo, Australia
 Donna Baker (born 1966), New Zealand international footballer
 Dorothy Baker (writer) (1907–1968), American writer
 Dorothy Baker (madam) (c. 1916–1973), American madam
 Doug or Douglas Baker (disambiguation)
 Dusty Baker (born 1949), American Major League Baseball player and manager
 Dylan Baker (born 1959), American actor

E
 E. Ballard Baker (1917–1985), American jurist
 E. C. Stuart Baker (1864–1944), British ornithologist and police officer
 E. D. Baker, American children's novelist
 Earl Baker (1925–1999), American football coach
 Earl M. Baker (born 1940), American politician
 Edmund Baker (1854–1911), American politician
 Ed, Eddie or Edward Baker (disambiguation)
 Edwin Baker (disambiguation)
 Elijah Baker (born 1991), British actor
 Elizabeth Baker (1876–1962), English playwright
 Elizabeth Baker (economist) (1885–1973), American economist and academic
 Ella Baker (1903-1986), African-American civil rights and human rights activist
 Ellis Baker (died 1984), American theatre actress
 Elsie Baker (1883–1971), American actress and singer
 Eric Baker (activist) (1920–1976), founder of Amnesty International
 Eric Baker (businessman) (born 1973), American businessman, founder and CEO of Viagogo, co-founder of StubHub
 Erica Baker (born 1980), American engineer
 Ethan Baker (born 2006), Man of many talents
 Ethelwyn Baker (1899–1988), British artist
 Etta Baker (1931–2006), American blues musician and guitarist

F
 Fanny Baker Ames née Baker, (1840–1931), American philanthropist and women's rights leader
 Fay Baker (1917–1987), American actress and author
 Francis Patrick Baker (1873–1959), member of the Australian House of Representatives
 Francis Matthew John Baker (1903–1939), member of the Australian House of Representatives
 Frank Baker (disambiguation)
 Franklin Baker (1846–1923), American entrepreneur
 Franklin Baker (minister) (1800–1867), English Unitarian minister
 Fred or Frederick Baker (disambiguation)

G
 Gary Baker (disambiguation)
 Garry Baker (born 1953), Australian Rules footballer
 Gavin Baker (born 1988), English cricketer
 Gene Baker (1925–1999), American baseball player
 Geoff or Geoffrey Baker (disambiguation)
 George Baker (disambiguation),
 Gerry Baker (disambiguation)
 Ginger Baker (1939–2019), English musician, best known for being a member of 60's psychedelic-rock band Cream
 Gladys Baker (1889–1974), English artist
 Gladys Pearl Baker (1902–1984), American film editor, mother of actress Marilyn Monroe and writer Berniece Baker Miracle
 Gordon Park Baker (1938–2002), American-English philosopher
 Grafton Baker (c. 1806–1881), first chief justice of the Supreme Court of the New Mexico Territory
 Graham Baker (footballer) (born 1958), English former footballer
 Graham Baker (director), British film director
 Grant Baker (born 1973), South African surfer
 Greg Baker (born 1968), American actor
 Gregg Baker, American football coach
 Gus Baker (1922–1994), American painter, illustrator and photographer
 Guy Baker, American water polo coach

H
 H. F. Baker (1866–1956), British mathematician
 Harriette Newell Woods Baker (1815–1893; pen name, "Aunt Hattie"), American writer
 Harry Baker (disambiguation)
 Heather Baker (born 1984), American singer, songwriter and guitarist
 Helen Baker (tennis) (fl.1920), American tennis player
 Helen Baker (author) (born 1948), English author
 Henry Baker (disambiguation)
 Hettie Gray Baker (1880–1957), American film editor
 Herbert Baker (1862–1946), South African architect
 Herbert F. Baker (1862–1930), American politician
 Herschel Clay Baker (1914–1990), American professor of English literature
 Hilary Baker (1746–1798), Mayor of Philadelphia
 Hobey Baker (1892–1918), American sportsman and pilot
 Horace Baker (politician), acting Governor of New Jersey
 Horace Baker (footballer) (1910–1974), English footballer
 Horace Burrington Baker (1889–1971), American malacologist
 Howard Baker Sr., member of the United States House of Representatives
 Howard Baker (1925–2014), U.S. senator from Tennessee, U.S. ambassador to Japan
 Hugh Baker (disambiguation)

I
 Iain or Ian Baker (disambiguation)
 Irene Baker (1901–1994), member of the U.S. House of Representatives
 Irene Baker (botanist) (1918–1989), botanist

J
 J. N. L. Baker (1893–1971), British geographer
 Jack Baker (disambiguation)
 Jim or James Baker (disambiguation)
 Janet Baker (born 1933), English mezzo-soprano
 Jeannine Baker, Australian historian
 Jerome Baker (disambiguation)
 Jerry Baker (disambiguation)
 Jesse Baker (disambiguation)
 Joanna Baker, American professor of ancient languages
 Joe Baker (1940–2003), English footballer
 Joe Don Baker (born 1936), American actor
 John Baker (disambiguation)
 Josephine Baker (1906–1975), American-French entertainer, French Resistance member and civil rights worker
 Julien Baker (born 1995), American singer, songwriter, and guitarist
 Julius Baker (1915–2003), American musician
 Julius Stafford Baker, English cartoonist

K
 Kate Baker (1861–1953), Irish-born Australian teacher
 Kathy Baker (born 1950), American actress
 Kawaan Baker (born 1998), American football player
 Kelly J. Baker (born 1980), American writer and editor
 Kenneth Baker (disambiguation)
 Kevin Baker (disambiguation)
 Kieron Baker (born 1949), English footballer
 Kyle Baker, American cartoonist

L
 LaVern Baker (1929–1997), American R&B singer
 Lawrence James Baker (1827–1921), Queen Victoria's Stock-jobber
 Leigh-Allyn Baker, American actress
 Lena Baker (1901–1945), African-American convicted of murder
 Lewis Baker (footballer) (born 1995), English footballer
 Linda Baker (born 1948), American schoolteacher and politician
 Lionel Baker (born 1984), West Indian cricketer
 Lynn Baker, American bridge player
 Lynne Rudder Baker, (1944–2017), American philosopher
 Loran Ellis Baker (1831–1899), Nova Scotian businessman
 Loran Ellis Baker (politician) (1905–1991), Canadian politician
 Luken Baker (born 1997), American baseball player

M
 Malcolm Baker, (1929–2014), Korean war colonel, founder of Hyrex Pharmaceuticals
 Mark Baker (disambiguation)
 Martin Baker (disambiguation)
 Mary Baker (1791–1865), English impostor posing as "Princess Caraboo"
 Matt or Matthew Baker (disambiguation)
Mary Baker Eddy (1821–1910), née Baker, American founder of the Church of Christ, Scientist
 Maureen Baker (doctor) (born 1958), Scottish medical doctor, Chair of the Royal College of General Practitioners 2013–2016
 Maureen Baker (fashion designer) (1920/21–2017), British fashion designer
 Mel Baker, Wales and British Lions rugby player
 Melvin Baker (born 1950), American football player
 Mickey Baker, American guitarist
 Milo Samuel Baker (1868–1961), American botanist
 Morgan Baker, Australian actor

N
 Newton D. Baker (1871–1937), American mayor of Cleveland, Ohio, and United States Secretary of War
 Nicholson Baker, American author
 Norman Baker (disambiguation)

O
 Orlando Harrison Baker (1830–1913), American college professor and U.S. consul
 Ox Baker (1934–2014), American professional wrestler David Baker Sr.

P
 Patricia Baker, American archaeologist
 Paul Baker (disambiguation)
 Perry Baker (born 1986), American rugby sevens player
 Peter Baker (disambiguation)

R
 Ray Stannard Baker (1870–1946), American journalist and author
 Reginald Baker (disambiguation)
 Richard Baker (disambiguation)
 Robert Baker (disambiguation)
 Robin Baker (biologist), evolutionary biologist and author of Sperm Wars
 Robin Baker (academic), academic and Vice-Chancellor of Canterbury Christ Church University
 Ron Baker (American football) (born 1954), American offensive lineman
 Ron Baker (basketball) (born 1993), American shooting guard
 Ronald James Baker (1924–2020), Canadian academic administrator
 Ronnie Baker (athlete) (born 1993), American sprinter
 Ronnie Baker (musician) (1947–1990), American bass guitarist and record producer
 Rose Baker, British physicist, mathematician, and statistician
 Russell Baker (1925–2019), American writer
 Ruth Baker, British mathematical biologist

S
 Samuel Baker (1821–1893), British explorer
 Sara Josephine Baker (1873–1945), American doctor and public health worker
 Sarah Martha Baker (1887–1917), British botanist and ecologist
 Simon Baker (racewalker) (born 1958), Australian race walker
 Simon Baker (born 1969), Australian film and television actor
 Stanley Baker (1928–1976), Welsh actor and producer
 Stephen Baker (disambiguation)
 Steve or Steven Baker (disambiguation)

T
 Ted Baker (chemist) (born 1942), New Zealand scientist
 Ted Baker (footballer) (1901–1986), Aussie rules footballer
 Ted Baker (publican) (1872–1936), South Australian sportsman
 Tom or Thomas Baker (disambiguation)
 Trevor Baker, known as Trevor the Weather, long-serving Welsh TV weatherman
 Troy Baker, American voice actor

V
 Valentine Baker, 19th C, British Army General
 Vin Baker (born 1971), American basketball player

W
 Warren J. Baker (1938–2022), American university president
 Walter Baker (disambiguation)
 Wesley Baker (1958–2005), American convicted murderer
 Wheeler R. Baker, Maryland politician
 Wiki Baker, vocalist and community worker from New Zealand
 William Baker (disambiguation)
 Willie Baker, American Piedmont blues guitarist, singer and songwriter
 Wiri Baker (1892–1966), New Zealand cricketer

Y
 Yvette Baker (born 1968), British orienteer
 Yvette Baker (synchronised swimmer) (born 1991), British synchronised swimmer

Z
 Zachary Baker (born 1981), American musician better known as Zacky Vengeance

Fictional characters
 Andrew "Andy" Baker, in the Netflix series 13 Reasons Why
 Becky Baker, in the Canadian television series Degrassi: The Next Generation
 Billy Baker, in the television series All American
 Brian Baker (The Wire), a police officer on the HBO drama The Wire
 Douglas Baker (EastEnders), on the British soap opera EastEnders (2007)
 Hannah Baker, in the novel and Netflix series 13 Reasons Why
 Jordan Baker (The Great Gatsby), in the novel The Great Gatsby by F. Scott Fitzgerald
 Luke Baker, in Degrassi
 Olivia Baker, in the Netflix series 13 Reasons Why
 Willie Baker, in the television series All American
 Baker family, a family in the 2017 video game Resident Evil 7: Biohazard

See also
 Justice Baker (disambiguation), various judges with the surname Baker
 Backer, a Norwegian surname
 Bakker, a Norwegian, Swedish, Danish, or Dutch surname

References

English-language surnames
Occupational surnames
Surnames of English origin
English-language occupational surnames